Han Jialiang (born October 22, 1987) is a Chinese short track speed skater. He represented China at the 2010 Winter Olympics in Vancouver.

References

External links 
Han Jialiang at ISU
 
 
 

1987 births
Living people
Chinese male short track speed skaters
Olympic short track speed skaters of China
Short track speed skaters at the 2010 Winter Olympics
Short track speed skaters at the 2011 Asian Winter Games
21st-century Chinese people